3 is the third studio album by American blues rock band Buffalo Killers.  It was released on August 2, 2011, on Alive Naturalsound Records.  Of the first thousand vinyl copies, half were released on blue vinyl and the other half on purple.

Critical reception
In a review for AllMusic, critic reviewer Mark Deming wrote: "While there isn't much here that suggests a shameless rip-off of any artist in particular, 3 conjures up a sense of time and place with ease, and the loose, sun-burnt vibe of this music, fused with Andy's fluid but forceful guitar work, Zach's simple but effective basslines, and Joey Sebaali's colorful percussion work drifts between country-rock and hard rock in a way that suggests the strengths of both without hitching itself to either."

Track listing

Personnel

Band members
 Zach Gabbard – bass guitar, vocals
 Andy Gabbard – guitar, vocals
 Joey Sebaali – drums

Additional musicians
 Kelley Deal – vocals on "Could Never Be"
 Sven Kahns – lap steel
 James Leg – keyboards on "Circle Day" and "Could Never Be"
 Brian Olive – saxophone
 Ryan Wells – banjo

Production
 Buffalo Killers – production
 Mike Montgomery – recording and mixing
 Joshua Marc Levy – art direction, design and illustration

References

2011 albums
Buffalo Killers albums
Alive Naturalsound Records albums